Yates is an unincorporated community in Wibaux County, Montana, United States.  Its elevation is 2,782 feet (848 m).  A post office was established in Yates on December 1, 1908 but was closed on July 15, 1920.

References

Unincorporated communities in Wibaux County, Montana
Unincorporated communities in Montana